Tompkins Wake is a New Zealand law firm, headquartered in Hamilton, New Zealand with offices also in Auckland, Rotorua and Tauranga. The firm was founded as Tompkins and Wake in Hamilton on 22 June 1922 by Lance Tompkins and Cecil Barry Wake (known as Barry Wake).

Tompkins was a prominent lawyer in Hamilton. In 1958, he was appointed a Queen's Counsel. In 1963, he was called to the Supreme Court.

Sir David Tompkins (Lance Tompkins' son), studied from 1947 to 1952 and graduated from the then University of New Zealand with an LLB. He was also a partner in Tompkins Wake, was made a QC, and then sat as a High Court Judge in Auckland. Sir David was Chancellor of the University of Waikato from 1981 to 1985

While the firm still bears its founders' names, it did become Tompkins, Wake, Paterson and Bathgate during the 1960s through to the 1980s when it returned to Tompkins Wake.

The firm famously launched the "Case for Hamilton" in 2009, threatening to sue the rest of New Zealand because it was difficult to recruit lawyers.

In November 2010 Tompkins Wake acquired Swarbrick Dixon to create Hamilton's largest law firm. The firm then opened its Auckland office in 2012 and in November 2014 Tompkins Wake merged with Davys Burton in Rotorua.

Current partners 

The current partnership of Tompkins Wake are:

Bridget Parham, Bryce Davey, Campbell Stewart, Catriona Gordon, Chen Jiang, Daniel Erickson, Fraser Wood, James MacGillivray, Karina McLuskie, Kate Cornegé, Kate Sullivan, Kate Searancke, Kerri Dewe, Mark Hammond, Mark Renner, Michael Shanahan, Peter Duncan, Peter Fanning, Philip Monahan, Phil Taylor, Scott Ratuki, Shelley Slade-Gully, Stephanie Ambler, Theresa Le Bas, Tom Arieli, Wayne Hofer, Zandra Wackenier.

Awards and recognition

2016 

 New Zealand Law Awards Finalist – Mid Market Deal of the Year

2017 

 Best Lawyers 2017 – Robert Bycroft, leading authority in Biotechnology Law
 New Zealand Law Awards Finalist – Mid Size Law Firm of the Year
 New Zealand Law Awards Finalist – Consumer, Media and Tech Deal of the Year

2018 

 The Legal 500 Asia Pacific – Leading Firm, Corporate M& A, Projects and Resource Management (Tier 3) 
 The Legal 500 Asia Pacific – Recommended Lawyers, Bridget Parham, Bryce Davey, Mark Renner, Phil Taylor, Robert Bycroft, Theresa Le Bas, Tom Arieli
 Best Lawyers 2018 – Robert Bycroft, leading authority in Biotechnology Law
New Zealand Law Awards Finalist – Mid Size law Firm of the Year
New Zealand Law Awards Finalist – Employer of Choice (51–100 Lawyers)
New Zealand Law Awards Finalist – Mid-Market Deal of the Year

2019 

 The Legal 500 Asia Pacific – Leading Firm, Corporate M& A (Tier 4), Projects and Resource Management (Tier 3)
 The Legal 500 Asia Pacific – Recommended Lawyers, Bridget Parham, Bryce Davey, Marianne Mackintosh, Mark Renner, Philip Monahan, Phil Taylor, Robert Bycroft, Theresa Le Bas, Tom Arieli
Chambers and Partners, Asia Pacific – Liz Lim, Recognised Practitioner, Banking and Finance, New Zealand
Best Lawyers 2019 – Robert Bycroft, leading authority in Biotechnology Law
New Zealand Lawyer, 2019 Innovative Law Firm, Winner 
Asialaw Profiles - Notable Firm, Real Estate and Construction Law
Asialaw Profiles - Scott Ratuki - Notable Practitioner, Construction Law
New Zealand Law Awards Winner - Mid-Size Law Firm of the Year
New Zealand Law Awards Winner - Managing Partner of the Year (<100 Lawyers), Jon Calder
New Zealand Law Awards Finalist - Mid-Market Deal of the Year
New Zealand Law Awards Finalist - Employer of Choice (51-100 Lawyers)
International Financial Legal Review (IFLR 1000), Notable Firm, Banking and Finance

2020 

 New Zealand Lawyer, 2020 Employer of Choice, Winner
 Best Lawyers 2020 - Robert Bycroft, leading authority in Biotechnology Law 
 Best Lawyers 2020 - Mark Lowndes, leading authority in Corporate Law
 The Legal 500 Asia Pacific - Leading Firm, Banking and Finance, Corporate M& A, Dispute Resolution, Intellectual Property, Projects and Resource Management (including Environment) and Real Estate and Construction
 The Legal 500 Asia Pacific - Leading Individual, Mark Lowndes
 The Legal 500 Asia Pacific - Recommended Lawyers, Bridget Parham, James MacGillivray, Kate Cornegé , Marianne Mackintosh, Mark Hammond, Mark Renner, Peter Duncan, Peter Fanning, Phil Taylor, Scott Ratuki, Shelley Slade-Gully, Stephanie Ambler, Theresa Le Bas and Tom Arieli
 The Legal 500 Asia Pacific - Next Generation Partner, Kerri Dewe
 The Legal 500 United Kingdom - Recommended Lawyer, Wayne Hofer
 Chambers and Partners, Asia Pacific & Global - Mark Lowndes, Ranked Lawyer, Corporate/Commercial, New Zealand
 Doyles Guide - Preeminent Lawyer, Family and Relationship Property - Zandra Wackenier
 New Zealand Lawyer, 2020 Innovative Law Firms, Winner
 International Financial Legal Review (IFLR1000) - Notable Firm, Project Development (Infrastructure projects, Energy and natural resources projects, Non-commercial construction (prisons, hospitals, etc.))
 International Financial Legal Review (IFLR1000) - Notable Firm, M&A
 New Zealand Law Awards Winner - Mid-size Law Firm of the Year 
 New Zealand Law Awards Winner - Managing Partner of the Year (<100 Lawyers), Jon Calder 
 New Zealand Law Awards Winner - Employer of Choice (51-100 Lawyers)

2021 

Best Lawyers - Mark Lowndes, leading authority in Corporate Law, Information Technology Law and Telecommunications Law
Best Lawyers - James MacGillivray, leading authority in Arbitration and Mediation | Litigation
Best Lawyers - Robert Bycroft, leading authority in Biotechnology Law
AsiaLaw Profiles - Mark Lowndes, Notable Practitioner, Corporate and M&A
 AsiaLaw Profiles - Notable Firm, Corporate and M&A, Construction, Dispute Resolution, Real Estate
 Chambers and Partners, Asia Pacific - Tompkins Wake, Dispute Resolution, Band 4
 Chambers and Partners, Asia Pacific - James MacGillivray, Dispute Resolution, Band 4
 Chambers and Partners, Asia Pacific & Global - Mark Lowndes, Corporate/Commercial, Band 4
 The Legal 500 Asia Pacific - Leading Firm, Dispute Resolution, Intellectual Property, Projects and Resources Management (including Environment), Real Estate and Construction, Corporate and M&A
 The Legal 500 Asia Pacific - Recommended Lawyers, Andrew Orme, Bridget Parham, Bryce Davey, Campbell Stewart, Fraser Wood, James MacGillivray, Kate Cornegé, Kate Searancke, Kerri Dewe, Mark Hammond, Mark Lowndes, Mark Renner, Marianne Mackintosh, Peter Duncan, Peter Fanning, Phil Taylor, Robert Bycroft, Scott Ratuki, Shelley Slade-Gully, Simon Jass, Stephanie Ambler, Theresa Le Bas and Tom Arieli

Other notable partners 
Judge John Bathgate
Sir Grant Hammond 
Wayne Boyd

References

Law firms of New Zealand
Law firms established in 1922
Companies based in Hamilton, New Zealand
Privately held companies of New Zealand